Halyna Anatoliivna Hutchins (April 10, 1979 – October 21, 2021) was a Ukrainian cinematographer. She worked on more than 30 feature-length films, short films, and TV miniseries, including the films Archenemy, Darlin', and Blindfire. On October 21, 2021, she was accidentally shot by actor Alec Baldwin using a prop gun that was not properly checked during production on the set of the film Rust. The incident resulted in her death.

Early life
Hutchins was born on April 10, 1979 in Horodets, Ukrainian SSR. She grew up in the Russian city of Murmansk, on a Soviet military base in the Arctic. There, her father served in the Soviet Navy. She called herself an "army brat". According to film historian Jim Hemphill, she first became interested in film while living at the military base. She attended National Agricultural University and then Kyiv National University, first studying economics before changing her study to journalism. Hutchins graduated with a degree in international journalism and worked on documentary films as an investigative journalist in Eastern Europe. She met her husband Matthew, who is American, while in the US. They had a son, Andros. Though living in the US, she maintained her Ukrainian citizenship, remained proud of her heritage and often returned to visit.

Career
Hutchins moved to Los Angeles to focus on filmmaking, taking on roles in production and fashion photography. She was an associate producer for World's Tallest Man, a 2006 film about Leonid Stadnyk by Wild Pictures; the film was premiered on the Discovery Channel. In 2010, she graduated from UCLA TFT Professional Program in Producing. In Los Angeles, she met Bob Primes, a cinematographer. He encouraged Hutchins to apply to the American Film Institute Conservatory, where he was a teacher. She was accepted and began studying there in 2013 for a two-year master's program, which she graduated from in 2015.  mentored her there. Her thesis project, Hidden, made with director Rayan Farzad, was screened at the LA Shorts Fest, Camerimage International Film Festival, AFI Fest and the Austin Film Festival.

In 2018, she was one of the first eight female cinematographers participating in the Fox DP Lab program, which was established to provide greater opportunities for women cinematographers. In 2019, she was named one of the "10 up-and-coming directors of photography who are making their mark" by American Cinematographer.

She was director of photography on Adam Egypt Mortimer's 2020 film Archenemy. Mortimer had said of her, that her "tastes and sensibility of what is cinematic were a huge asset for executing our style" and that "her AFI training and her skill with the math of LUT settings gave us the best texture I've found yet in shooting digital".

She is also credited for work on the films Darlin' (2019), Blindfire (2020) and The Mad Hatter (2021). She was credited for her cinematographic work on Darlin''' by Hollywood.com, where the film was highlighted after its feature at the March 2019 South by Southwest film festival, in the Narrative Feature Competition.

 Activism 
Hutchins was a member of the International Cinematographers Guild and the International Alliance of Theatrical Stage Employees, labor unions that represent entertainment industry's crew and technical workers in the US and Canada. She supported the IATSE strike over working conditions days before her death.

 Death 

On October 21, 2021, Hutchins was working as director of photography on the set of the Western film Rust, near La Cienega, New Mexico. While preparing for a scene, actor Alec Baldwin discharged a Pietta .45 Colt revolver used as a prop, fatally wounding her and injuring director Joel Souza. She died later that day at the age of 42 while being transferred to the University of New Mexico Hospital in Albuquerque. Baldwin released a statement the next day expressing shock and sadness at the incident. He said he would cooperate with police and offered support to her family.

A candlelight vigil at the Albuquerque Civic Plaza was organized by local IATSE chapters and held on October 23. It drew hundreds of people. She was buried at Hollywood Forever Cemetery in Hollywood, California.

On February 15, 2022, it was reported that the family of Hutchins had filed a lawsuit against Baldwin and other crew members of the film Rust, alleging that her wrongful death on the set was caused by irresponsible behavior and cost-cutting. The lawsuit was settled for undisclosed sums, on October 5, 2022, with her widower being given a job as executive producer of the film.

Legacy
In October 2021, following Hutchins's death, teachers and friends of hers at the American Film Institute established the Halyna Hutchins Memorial Scholarship Fund dedicated to supporting the education of female cinematographers. Hutchins's widower Matt Hutchins endorsed the project and asked for anyone wishing to honor her memory to donate to the fund.

Hutchins's death inspired calls for gun safety reform on film sets. Alexi Hawley, a producer of the American police procedural The Rookie, confirmed that, following Hutchins's death, all live guns on the show were to be replaced with Airsoft guns and CG flashes. Eric Kripke, showrunner of the American superhero TV series The Boys, similarly vowed to ban blanks and guns on his show.

Less than two hours after Hutchins's death, filmmaker Bandar Albuliwi, a former AFI Conservatory Directing fellow classmate (class of 2010), proposed a ban on real guns on film and television sets. He created a petition for "Halyna's Law" on Change.org, which was signed by actors Olivia Wilde, Dwayne Johnson, Ariana DeBose, Julianne Moore, Anna Paquin, Elijah Wood, Lena Dunham and Ava DuVernay. Albuliwi has been working with state senators, including California State Senator Dave Cortese, to propose California legislation that would make it a felony to use real ammunition on film and television sets. Over 200 cinematographers called in an open letter to ban functional firearms on film sets.

In November 2021, the American Society of Cinematographers posthumously honored Hutchins's work as a cinematographer by awarding her honorary membership.

In November 2022, an official documentary on Halyna's life, directed by Halyna's close friend and collaborator Rachel Mason, was announced by Story Syndicate.

 Filmography 
 World's Tallest Man (2006)
 Snowbound (2017)
 A Luv Tale: The Series (2018–2021)
 Darlin' (2019)
 Archenemy (2020)
 Blindfire (2020)
 To the New Girl (2020)
 The Mad Hatter (2021)
 Rust (TBA)

 See also 
 List of film and television accidents

References

 Further reading 
 Calhoun, John (February 2019). "AC Special Focus: Rising Stars of Cinematography". American Cinematographer''. pp. 20, 22

External links 

 
 
 Halyna Hutchins at International Collective of Female Cinematographers

1979 births
2021 deaths
20th-century Ukrainian women
21st-century Ukrainian journalists
21st-century Ukrainian women
AFI Conservatory alumni
Accidental deaths in New Mexico
American women cinematographers
American cinematographers
Burials at Hollywood Forever Cemetery
Deaths by firearm in New Mexico
Firearm accident victims in the United States
National University of Life and Environmental Sciences of Ukraine alumni
People from Zhytomyr Oblast
Taras Shevchenko National University of Kyiv alumni
University of Kyiv, Journalism Institute alumni
UCLA Film School alumni
Ukrainian cinematographers
Ukrainian emigrants to the United States
Ukrainian women journalists
21st-century American women